India's tribal belt refers to contiguous areas of settlement of Tribal people of India, that is, groups or tribes that remained genetically homogenous as opposed to other population groups that mixed widely within the Indian subcontinent. The tribal population in India, although a small minority, represents an enormous diversity of groups. They vary in language and linguistic traits, ecological settings in which they live, physical features, size of the population, the extent of acculturation, dominant modes of making a livelihood, level of development and social stratification. They are also spread over the length and breadth of the country though their geographical distribution is far from uniform. A majority of the Scheduled Tribe population is concentrated in the eastern, central and western belt covering the nine States of Odisha, Madhya Pradesh, Chhattisgarh, Jharkhand, Maharashtra, Gujarat, Rajasthan, Andhra Pradesh and West Bengal. About 12 percent inhabit the North-eastern region, about five percent in the Southern region and about three percent in the Northern States.

Northwest India
The Tribal Belt of Northwest and east India includes the state of Rajasthan. The tribal people of this region have origins which precede the arrival of the Ancestral North Indians and are linked to the Ancestral South Indians. These people are thought to stem back to the Harappan civilization of the Indus Valley, the oldest traceable civilization of the Indian subcontinent which flourished between 3500BC and 2500BC. 

The tribes of north-west India were once strongly matrilineal societies. The changing fates and fortunes of these people has caused a gradual evolution to a more patriarchal code of living. These days the tribal societies generally follow the rule of patriliny, but there remain many examples of organised matriarchy in existence in the tribal zones to this day. It is the women who organise matters such as relationships and marriages, the inheritance of land, and the distribution of wealth.

South Gujarat Tribal Belt 

The Southern Tribal Belt, popularly known as Dang, a forbidden territory covered with thick forests in the region of the South Gujarat. Located on the foothills of the Sahyadri range of mountains, it has green pastures, narrow roads, deep valleys, and wild animals. During the monsoon one can see water springs and a green carpet of diverse flora/fauna.

Spread across the lush green region of South Gujarat Tribal Belt said to be Kashmir of Gujarat. live the tribes of Bhil, Kholcha, Bhel, Nayaka, Koknas, Vedch, Gamits, Warlis, and Chaudaris.

Dakshin Gujarat Adivasi Sevamandal is an NGO founded by the Gandhian philosopher Premshankar Bhatt and his daughter Urmillaben Bhatt in 1948 to spread education in the deep forest of the South Gujarat Tribal Belt. It is registered as a trust under the Bombay Trust Act. It provides education to South Gujarat Tribals through a resident school (Ashramshalla) which offers free education, lodging and boarding. The Tribal Belt of Gujarat today has the highest literate tribal population in India.

Central & Eastern Tribal Belt India
The Central India Tribal Belt stretches from Gujarat in the west up to Assam in the east across the states of Madhya Pradesh, Chhattisgarh and Jharkhand. It is among the poorest regions of the country. Over 90% of the Belt's tribal population is rural, with primitive agriculture.

See also
 Adivasi ("Scheduled tribes")
 List of Scheduled Tribes in India
 Eklavya Model Residential School

Sources

References

External links
Article at Naturecamps.co.in
Programs at Centre for Environmental Protection & Cultural Exchange (CEPCE)

Ethnic groups in India
Scheduled Tribes of India
Lands inhabited by indigenous peoples
Belt regions